Durio kutejensis, commonly known as durian pulu, durian merah, nyekak, Pakan, Kuluk, or lai, is a primary rainforest substorey fruit tree from Borneo.

Description
It is a very attractive small- to medium-sized tree up to 30 m tall. It has large, glossy leaves, numerous large, red flowers that emit a strong carrion smell at anthesis. This species is reportedly pollinated by giant honey bees and birds, as well as bats. The large durian fruit it bears has thick, yellow flesh with a mild, sweet taste and creamy texture similar to that of Durio zibethinus. It bears fruit late in the season.

Usage
It is cultivated in East Kalimantan and has been introduced to Queensland. In Brunei, the fruit of D. kutejensis is preferred by local consumers over that of D. zibethinus, though the latter is the only durian species available in the international market.  The fruit is also said to have fewer of the unpleasant flavors that D. zibethinus has.

Gallery

References

Further reading

kutejensis
Endemic flora of Borneo
Fruits originating in Asia
Trees of Borneo
Vulnerable flora of Asia
Taxa named by Odoardo Beccari
Taxa named by Justus Carl Hasskarl
Plants described in 1889